Irbisia is a genus of plant bugs in the family Miridae. There are more than 20 described species in Irbisia. These black insects are 5-8 mm in length. They are also called black grass bugs as they are common in spring grasses.

Species
These 25 species belong to the genus Irbisia:

 Irbisia bliveni Schwartz, 1984
 Irbisia brachycera (Uhler, 1872)
 Irbisia californica Van Duzee, 1921
 Irbisia cascadia Schwartz, 1984
 Irbisia castanipes Van Duzee, 1921
 Irbisia cuneomaculata Blatchley, 1934
 Irbisia elongata Knight, 1941
 Irbisia fuscipubescens Knight, 1941
 Irbisia incomperta Bliven, 1963
 Irbisia knighti Schwartz & Lattin, 1984
 Irbisia limata Bliven, 1963
 Irbisia mollipes Van Duzee, 1917
 Irbisia morio (Reuter, 1909)
 Irbisia nigripes Knight, 1925
 Irbisia oreas Bliven, 1963
 Irbisia pacifica (Uhler, 1872) (Pacific grass bug)
 Irbisia panda Bliven, 1963
 Irbisia sericans (Stal, 1858)
 Irbisia serrata Bliven, 1963
 Irbisia setosa Van Duzee, 1921
 Irbisia shulli Knight, 1941
 Irbisia silvosa Bliven, 1961
 Irbisia sita Van Duzee, 1921
 Irbisia solana Heidemann
 Irbisia solani (Heidemann, 1910)

References

Further reading

 
 
 

Miridae genera
Articles created by Qbugbot
Mirini